Hualong may refer to:

Places

In China
Hualong District (华龙区), Puyang, Henan
Hualong Hui Autonomous County (化隆回族自治县), of Haidong Prefecture, Qinghai
Hualong, Guangzhou (化龙镇), town in Panyu District, Guangzhou, Guangdong
Hualong, Shouguang (化龙镇), town in Shouguang City, Shandong

Other uses
Hualong One, a Chinese pressurized water nuclear reactor design.